Bluefield State University (Bluefield State) is a university in Bluefield, West Virginia that is an historically black university. It is a part of West Virginia's public education system and converted to a university in the summer of 2022. It added residential housing options that include double or single rooms with full meal plans. Bluefield State University is a member school of the Thurgood Marshall College Fund.

History
The Bluefield Colored Institute was founded in 1895 as a "high graded school" for African-American youth in the nearby area; at that time, the West Virginia Constitution prohibited "racial" integration in publicly supported schools, and until 1891, when West Virginia Colored Institute was founded, there was no education at the college level for African Americans in West Virginia (except at the private Storer College). It was located on a  site in Bluefield, a city within 100 miles of 70% of West Virginia's Black citizens. The school began with 40 pupils under the supervision of Principal Hamilton Hatter. Nathan Cook Brackett, an abolitionist who led Storer College, served as president of the Board of Regents. Hatter oversaw the construction of Mahood Hall, the administrative building, as well as Lewis Hall and West Hall dormitories. Hatter built the foundation of the college. He faced enormous challenges, running the institution with no legislative appropriations whatsoever for two years.

In the late 1920s, the students and staff of the school referred to it as "Bluefield Institute", but this name was never sanctioned by the West Virginia legislature. In 1906, Hatter handed the reins of leadership at BCI to Robert P. Sims, a graduate of Hillsdale College, who would lead Bluefield State for three decades. Sims showed dedication, commitment, and prudent management in his lengthy tenure at Bluefield State. In 1909, Sims established Bluefield as a normal school, training teachers.

Enrollment climbed to 235 by 1920, with annual summer sessions for teacher certification attracting hundreds more. The college prospered, expanding to 23 acres, adding Payne Hall and colonnaded Conley Hall, faculty residences, and the stately President's House. Enrollment soon exceeded six hundred, many of whom lived on the close-knit campus, termed the "terraced hills" for its verdant landscaping. Grateful graduates created the Alumni Association to rekindle collegiate memories and support programs of the institution. Bluefield students achieved notable distinction in a wide variety of fields.

Sims and his successor, academic dean and BCI alumnus Henry Dickason, president from 1936 to 1952, managed this growth with patience and resourcefulness. Bluefield State Teachers College, as the institution was renamed in 1931, was at the center of the rich cultural world of African-American society. Although the rough and tumble bituminous coalfields were far from the urban and sophisticated east coast, Sims and Dickason managed to involve their college heavily in the explosion of black American culture known as the "Harlem Renaissance," bringing Langston Hughes to read poetry, John Hope Franklin to teach Negro History, and even heavyweight champion Joe Louis to box exhibitions in Arter Gymnasium. Fats Waller, Duke Ellington, Dizzie Gillespie, and Count Basie entertained the active Greek-letter fraternities and sororities. Bluefield State's "Big Blue" football team twice won national Negro College Athletic Association championships in the late 1920s.

A 1929 survey of the 702 alumni of Bluefield State demonstrated the college's wide-ranging influence. There were 326 school teachers, along with dozens of administrators, physicians, pharmacists, ministers, businessmen, and homemakers. The name "Bluefield State College" was adopted in 1943. After a half-century Bluefield State was awarded full academic accreditation in 1947, rewarding the institution's measured progress. By September 1954, the state-supported colleges in West Virginia were integrated. Three white students (James Ernest Watkins, Joseph Tice and Douglas Ralph Whittaker) in a total body of 354 enrolled at Bluefield State.

By the 1960s, the college had a comprehensive four-year program of teacher education, arts and sciences, and engineering technology. Gradually a variety of two-year technical programs evolved in response to local needs.

During the late 1960s, black students protested that the state was transforming the school from a traditional black college to a white commuter college. One of the allegations made was that black faculty and staff were being fired and replaced by less qualified white personnel. On November 21, 1968, the racial tensions culminated in the bombing of the gymnasium. A $5,000 reward was offered by Governor Hulett C. Smith. Ironically, the administration responded by immediately closing the dormitories, which housed a significant percentage of the college's out-of-state black student population, hastening the transition to a predominantly white college.

The Alpha House and President's House, Bluefield State College (now named The "Hatter" House) are listed on the National Register of Historic Places.

In 2003, the school's two-year programs, except for those in nursing and engineering technology, were separated out to form New River Community and Technical College.

The institution's name changed to Bluefield State University in the summer of 2022.

Academics

Instructional programs are offered in engineering technologies, business, teacher education, arts and sciences, nursing and health science professions, and a variety of career fields. Students may also complete the non-traditional Regents Bachelor of Arts degree through Bluefield State University. The university is also dedicated to offering a wide variety of off campus courses at centers in Beckley, Lewisburg, Summersville and Welch, West Virginia.

, Bluefield's student body is 63.31% female and 36.69% male. Although Bluefield is a historically black university, its student body has the racial composition listed in the table.

Student life

Athletics

The Bluefield State athletic teams are called the Big Blues. The university is a member of the Division II level of the National Collegiate Athletic Association (NCAA), primarily competing as an NCAA D-II Independent (for most sports, including basketball and football) since the 2013–14 academic year; as well as a member of the United States Collegiate Athletic Association (USCAA) since the 2016–17 academic year. The Big Blues previously competed as a member of the West Virginia Intercollegiate Athletic Conference (WVIAC) from 1955–56 to 2012–13 (when the conference dissolved), then they were granted membership into the Eastern Collegiate Athletic Conference (ECAC) for some sports from 2013–14 to 2015–16.

Bluefield State competes in 21 intercollegiate varsity sports: Men's sports include baseball, basketball, cross country, football, golf, swimming, tennis, track & field and wrestling; while women's sports include acrobatics & tumbling, basketball, cheerleading, cross country, golf, soccer, softball, swimming, tennis, track & field and volleyball.

On December 8, 2022, Bluefield State got enough votes to gain entry into the Central Intercollegiate Athletic Association (CIAA), thus re-joining the league in nearly 70 years, beginning the 2023–24 academic year.

Football
The university fielded a football team until 1981. In 1927 and 1928, Bluefield State was voted the Black college football national champion by the Pittsburgh Courier. Ray Kemp was the team's coach for an extended period of time beginning in 1934. Joe Fourqurean played professionally for the British Columbia Lions of the Canadian Football League.

In August 2020, Bluefield State announced the addition of 12 athletic programs, which includes the resurrection of the football program. School President Robin Capeheart called it a huge step forward and it was saying there was life after COVID-19. The teams are set to start for the 2021–2022 season.

Intramurals
There are also several intramural sports including swimming, mixed martial arts, soccer, bowling and flag football.

Greek life
Bluefield State University currently has Alpha Kappa Alpha sorority as the only African American sorority on campus.

Notable alumni

References

External links
 Official website
 Official athletics website

 
NCAA Division II independents
1895 establishments in West Virginia
Historically black universities and colleges in the United States
Public universities and colleges in West Virginia
Education in Mercer County, West Virginia
Buildings and structures in Bluefield, West Virginia
Educational institutions established in 1895
African-American history of West Virginia
Historically segregated African-American schools in West Virginia